Michael Richards (born 11 October 1958) is a track cyclist from New Zealand. At the 1976 Summer Olympics at Montreal he came 9th in the 4000m individual pursuit.

He is a brother of cyclist Jamie Richards who also competed at the 1976 Olympics.

References 

 Black Gold by Ron Palenski (2008, 2004 New Zealand Sports Hall of Fame, Dunedin) p. 78

External links 

1958 births
Living people
New Zealand male cyclists
Olympic cyclists of New Zealand
Cyclists at the 1976 Summer Olympics
New Zealand track cyclists
Cyclists from Auckland
Commonwealth Games medallists in cycling
Commonwealth Games gold medallists for New Zealand
Cyclists at the 1978 Commonwealth Games
20th-century New Zealand people
Medallists at the 1978 Commonwealth Games